A firemark may refer to:

 Fire insurance mark, a historical mark to identify fire brigade coverage
 Port-wine stain, a mark on the human body caused by a vascular anomaly